KBET (790 kHz) is a commercial AM radio station licensed to Winchester, Nevada and broadcasting to the Las Vegas Valley. It is owned and operated by Silver State Broadcasting LLC and it airs a talk radio format. KBET uses the slogan "790 Talk Now: Talk That Rocks!" Its studios are in the unincorporated Clark County community of Enterprise.

KBET broadcasts at 1,000 watts by day, reducing power to 300 watts at night to avoid interfering with other stations on 790 AM.  The transmitter is off Telephone Pole Road in Whitney, Nevada.  KBET is also heard on FM translator 103.1 MHz K276GX in Las Vegas.  It is also heard on 104.3 MHz KFRH in North Las Vegas and 97.7 MHz KRCK-HD2 in Mecca, California along with its FM translators 95.5 MHz K238AK and 98.1 MHz K251BX, both licensed to Palm Desert, California.

KBET carries nationally syndicated conservative talk shows most of the day, mainly from Cumulus Media subsidiary Westwood One. They include Chris Plante, Dan Bongino and "Red Eye Radio."  In addition, "Armstrong & Getty" from KSTE Sacramento is heard in morning drive time.  Alex Jones from the Genesis Communications Network airs early weekday and weekend mornings and Ground Zero with Clyde Lewis is heard in late evenings.  Most hours begin with ABC News Radio.

History
On , the station first signed on the air.  Diamond Broadcasting spent $2.5 million to acquire the station's construction permit before it even was on the air.

On May 29, 2009, the Las Vegas Sun reported that the station had been sold to Silver State Communications LLC, and that the format would be changed to Sports radio. KBET later aired a Classic Country music format and was using the slogan: "Country Legends 790."  KBET began broadcasting a talk format on April 19, 2012.

The station is presently off the air. The published phone numbers from the website are not working. The listen live feature on the website is currently playing Fox News updates from 2017 during the Trump Administration.

Local programming and staff
 Wayne Allyn Root, Host of The Wayne Allyn Root Show on KBET and USA Radio Network from 3:00 p.m. to 6:00 p.m. on weekday afternoons and evenings.

Wayne Root is no longer on air at am 790. He currently is broadcasting at am 670 KMZQ Las Vegas.

References

External links

2003 establishments in Nevada
News and talk radio stations in the United States
Radio stations established in 2003
BET (AM)
BET